Centrolene altitudinalis is a species of frog in the family Centrolenidae.
It is endemic to Venezuela. Its natural habitats are subtropical or tropical moist montane forests and rivers. Its status is insufficiently known.

References

Sources

altitudinalis
Amphibians of the Andes
Taxa named by Juan A. Rivero
Taxonomy articles created by Polbot
Amphibians described in 1968